The Night Owls is a twice weekly webcomic by cartoonists Peter and Bobby Timony which appears every Tuesday and Thursday on DC Comics Zuda imprint. It was selected as Zuda's Instant Winner in December 2007. The Timony brothers have been based out of New Providence, New Jersey, a suburb of New York City.

Set in 1920s New York City, the strip follows the adventures of a group of detectives who solve supernatural crimes in the tradition of occult detective fiction. The strip alternates between single gags and longer story arcs, though each episode is designed to stand on its own. Although it often deals with bizarre and disturbing themes, the strip maintains a light-hearted tone that is generally suited for all ages. Each strip is usually six to eight panels long, has an art deco banner across the top and is colored in warm sepia hues.

Characters
 Professor Ernest Baxter is a bookwormish and kind of shy fellow who uses his vast knowledge of the supernatural world to try to help people.
 Mindy Markus is a feisty flapper with a modern "liberated" outlook on life who is not afraid to get into a scrap with the forces of evil.
 Roscoe the Gargoyle is a gargoyle from Coney Island with an insatiable appetite; he provides additional comic relief with his flippant and lighthearted approach to things.
 Detective Bill McRory is an honest cop who occasionally seeks help from the Night Owls on cases involving the supernatural.
 Mr. You is a faceless man who steals the faces of others.
 Mable the Gargoyle is Roscoe's sister who, when first introduced, looks inexplicably like a gorgeous blonde human.
 Filthy the Rat is The Professor's underworld informant. Filthy is a rat who is a "Were-Human": by the light of the full moon, he turns into a tiny human.
 Helaku is an Apache girl who met Professor Baxter when he was younger. Baxter helped the tribe defeat a giant monster named Big Owl.
 Ikshu is Helaku's older brother. He went to prison for bootlegging where he met Mr. You, who stole his face and escaped.

Print
Bayou and High Moon were the first two Zuda titles to be published as graphic novels, in June and October 2009, respectively by DC Comics. "Night Owls" was the third title to be released from the imprint and was released on March 30, 2010.

Awards
 Night Owls was nominated for three 2009 Harvey Awards, for Best New Series, Best Online Work, and Best New Talent for artist Bobby Timony.
 Night Owls''' character Mindy Markus was nominated for the 2010 Lulu Awards for BEST FEMALE CHARACTER 'for a lead female character from an ongoing or limited comic book series or comic strip, original graphic novel or novella, whether in print or online'.
 Night Owls'' was nominated as a finalist in the 2010 Cybil Awards for its achievements as one of the 'best children's and young adult titles' of the year.

References

External links
Read Night Owls on Zuda
Twin Comics Blog
Twin Comics Website
Mook Productions, LLC.
Twin Comics at IndyPlanet
Twin Comics at ComicSpace
The Night Owls animated on Youtube

Interviews
 The Timony Twins, in a podcast interview on Comics Coast to Coast
 The Knave of Krypton interviews the Night Owls
 The Independent Press interviews the Timony Twins.
 Amalgamated Artist's interviews with the Timony Twins about The Night Owls.

Comics set in the 1920s
Comics set in New York City
Detective comics
Occult detective fiction
Flappers
Zuda Comics titles
2000s webcomics
Horror webcomics
American comedy webcomics
2007 webcomic debuts